Mitrovica District (Kosovskomitrovački okrug) is one of the unified seven districts of Kosovo. Its administrative center and the largest city is Mitrovica. The district borders on the District of Peja to the south-west, the District of Pristina to the south-east and east, and the Republic of Serbia to the north and northwest.

History

The first human habitations here can be traced back to the Prehistoric period. Some Neolithic sites have been discovered in the Mitrovica District, such as in Runik, Žitkovac-Karagaç, Vallaç and Fafos. This region was populated by Dardanians, an Illyrian tribe that lived in the territory of modern-day Kosovo.
By the end of the 1st century BC, the Romans invaded the region. At the time, one of the most important centres in the region was Municipium Dardanorum, located in Sočanica, Leposavić. Archeological sites from the Roman period were also found in the territory of Vučitrn (Vicianum), for example the ruins in Pestova and the Rashan Fortress. 

Following Roman downfall, the Mitrovica was occupied by Byzantium. During the Justinian I period (527-565AD), the Old Fortress in Vučittn was built, which remains the city center today.
By the end of the 9th century, the region of Mitrovica became part of the Bulgarian state of Samuel.
The area was conquered by the Nemanjić dynasty in 1185. During Serbian rule, the region and Kosovo in general became a political and spiritual centre of the kingdom. The Ottomans later conquered the region in the 14th century and stayed until the 17th century. During this Ottoman period, Islam spread and many mosques, Turkish baths, madrasah, bridges and Ottoman houses were built. The cities of Vučitrn, Mitrovica and Zvečan became some of the largest cities in the region, and some of the most important in the Ottoman Empire. In 1912, after the Ottoman capitulation, Serbia acquired the territory of Kosovo. In the first World War, the region was part of the Austro-Hungarian Empire (1915–18), then part of the Kingdom of Serbs, Croats and Slovenes. In World War II, Germany conquered most of the territory in the region, while other areas fell to the Italians. 
After World War II, the economy grew in the region under Yugoslavia.

Geography

Relief

The terrain of the Mitrovica District is rugged and mountainous, comprising the south portion of Kopaonik mountain on the north-east, with the highest point  Pančić's Peak 2,017 meters above sea level (the northernmost extremity of Kosovo). The mountain ranges of Rogozna and Mokra Gora extend on the north-west by Zubin Potok with the peak of Berim, 1,731 meters (5,679 ft). The northern part of Drenica and Qyqavica mountain occupies the south-west part of region, while in the south east the boundary extends on the Plain of Kosovo. In the center of the region is the Ibar valley, where Mitrovica lies.

Hydrography

Regarding hydrography, Mitrovica District constitutes one of the richest regions in Kosovo. While a mountainous area, there are many small river sources in the region, and two of the most important rivers in Kosovo, Ibar and Sitnica, flow here. 
Ibar originates in Rožaje, eastern Montenegro, passes through Sandžak and enters Kosovo by the town of Zubin Potok. Near this town, the river is dammed by the Gazivoda Dam, creating the artificial Lake Gazivode. As the largest lake in Kosovo (area 11.9 km2 or 4.6 sq mi, altitude 693 m or 2,274 ft, depth 105 m or 344 ft), Gazivoda Lake represents one of the most important assets of Kosovo's economy. Below Gazivode, another reservoir is created, Lake Pridvorice. In Mitrovica, the Ibar receives Lushta river and Sitnica, which consist of the longest river in Kosovo. Sitnica passes through the town of Vushtrri what makes an important element for agriculture in this area. In Mitrovica it receives Trepça river which originates from Bajgora mountains, of Kopaonik range.

Demographics

Population

According to the results of 2011 census and Kosovo Agency of Statistics 2008-2009 data for the municipalities with Serbian majority: Zvečan, Leposavić, Zubin Potok and North part of Mitrovica, in this region live approximately 232,833 inhabitants or 13.38% of total population of Kosovo.

Note: North Mitrovica is also included into Mitrovica.

Ethnicities

The municipalities of Mitrovica, Vučitrn and Skenderaj have an Albanian majority, whilst the municipalities of Zubin Potok, Zvečan and Leposavić have an ethnic Serb majority. Serbs also form the majority of population in the northern part of Mitrovica, which is their cultural and political center in Kosovo.

Population by ethnicity

Data on municipalities of South Mitrovica, Vushtrri and Skenderaj according to 2011 population census.

As it is known, municipalities with Serbian majority: Zvečan, Leposavić, Zubin Potok and North part of 
Mitrovica did not participate in the population census conducted in April, 2011. For this part-municipalities the data is taken from the update 2008-2009.

Official languages
In the municipalities of Mitrovica Region, Albanian and Serbian languages are official languages, while in Mitrovica and Vushtrri, Turkish is recognized as a language in official use.

Administrative divisions

Municipalities 
Until 2012 Mitrovica region was divided into six municipalities. In 2013, after November elections in Kosovo, North Mitrovica officially became a separate municipality. The largest city is Mitrovica (46,230 inhabitants) and municipality of South Mitrovica (71,909 inhabitants).

Settlements in Mitrovica District 

This is the list of 48 settlements in the municipality of Mitrovica.

This is the list of 67 settlements in the municipality of Vushtrri.

Gallery

See also
 Subdivisions of Kosovo

Notes

References

 
Districts of Kosovo
Water in Kosovo